Hay fever weed may refer to:
 Ambrosia artemisiifolia
 Ambrosia trifida